Reedy Lake is a natural freshwater lake on the east side of Frostproof, Florida. Residences and citrus groves surround much of this lake. This lake has no public swimming areas. The city of Frostproof has a public fishing pier and it operates Henderson Field (a softball field) nearby. A public boat ramp also exists at Frostproof.

References

Lakes of Polk County, Florida